The 1993 Vuelta a Andalucía was the 39th edition of the Vuelta a Andalucía cycle race and was held on 2 February to 7 February 1993. The race started in Chiclana and finished in Granada. The race was won by Julián Gorospe.

General classification

References

Vuelta a Andalucia
Vuelta a Andalucía by year
1993 in Spanish sport